Blackwater is a village on the Isle of Wight, England. It is located about two miles south of Newport, close to the geographic centre of the island. It is in the civil parish of Arreton.  The Newclose County Cricket Ground is just to the north of the village.

Newport Junction Railway opened a railway station at Blackwater. Blackwater Station first appeared on railway timetables in June, 1876 and operated until June 6, 1956. The trackbed of the former railway line is now part of National Cycle Route 23.

Public transport is provided by Southern Vectis bus routes 2 and 3, serving Newport, Ryde, Sandown, Shanklin and Ventnor. Former Wightbus 33 between Newport and Ryde, also serves part of the village.

References

External links

Villages on the Isle of Wight